Salahuddin Ahmed was a Pakistani judge who served as the 1st chief justice of the Federal Shariat Court from 26 May 1980 to 25 May 1981 and the Supreme Court of Pakistan judge from 1 March 1970 until he retired in 1979.

Biography 
He was born on 1 January 1912 in Calcutta, British India. He obtained a degree in laws from the University of Calcutta. After completing his education, he was appointed as the Calcutta High Court advocate and then additional judge High Court of East Pakistan on 22 December 1960.

He became chief justice of Federal Shariat Court on 26 May 1980 and retired from Shariat Court on 25 May 1981.

References 

1912 births
Chief justices of the Federal Shariat Court
Justices of the Supreme Court of Pakistan
University of Calcutta alumni
Year of death missing